Godam Nagesh (born 21 October 1964), is an Indian politician. He hails from the Gond people.

G. Nagesh was elected to the Andhra Pradesh Legislative Assembly in the 1994 election from the Boath seat, contesting as a Telugu Desam Party candidate. His father G. Rama Rao, former Minister for Tribal Welfare, was incumbent legislator of Boath at the time. G. Nagesh won the seat, obtaining 51,593 votes (65.27% of the votes in the constituency). He was amongst the youngest legislators in the Legislative Assembly at the time. G. Nagesh was named as Minister of State for Scheduled Tribes Welfare and Welfare of the Handicapped in the TDP state government after the election.

He retained the Boath seat in the 1999 election, obtaining 49,155 votes (56.17%). He lost the Boath seat in the 2004 election, finishing in second place with 41,567 votes. Reportedly his father opposed his candidature in the 2004 election. He re-captured the Boath seat in the 2009 Legislative Assembly election, obtaining 64,895 votes (55.92%). G. Nagesh served as the president of the TDP district unit in Adilabad. He has also served as chairman of the Girijan Cooperative Corporation.

Ahead of the 2014 Lok Sabha election, he left the TDP and joined the Telangana Rashtra Samithi (TRS) instead. He was admitted to the TRS by the party chief K. Chandrasekhar Rao on 3 March 2014. After joining TRS he was listed as the candidate of the party in the Boath Legislative Assembly seat. However, G. Nagesh asked to get the nomination for the Adilabad Lok Sabha seat instead. On 8 April 2014, he was declared as the TRS candidate for the Adilabad Lok Sabha seat.

References

Living people
Telugu Desam Party politicians
Telangana Rashtra Samithi politicians
India MPs 2014–2019
Telangana politicians
Andhra Pradesh MLAs 1994–1999
Andhra Pradesh MLAs 1999–2004
Lok Sabha members from Telangana
People from Telangana
People from Adilabad district
1964 births